Andrew Phelps McCormick (December 18, 1832 – November 2, 1916) was a United States circuit judge of the United States Court of Appeals for the Fifth Circuit and of the United States Circuit Courts for the Fifth Circuit and previously was a United States district judge of the United States District Court for the Northern District of Texas.

Education and career

Born in Brazoria County (then part of Mexico, now Texas), McCormick received an Artium Baccalaureus degree from Centre College in 1854 and read law in 1855. He was in private practice in Brazoria, Texas from 1855 to 1861, becoming a Texas district judge in 1856. He was in the Confederate States Army during the American Civil War, from 1861 to 1865, and was thereafter again a Judge of the Brazoria County Court and a probate judge from 1865 to 1866. He was a Judge of the Texas District Court for Brazoria and Galveston Counties from 1871 to 1876. He served in the Texas Senate from 1876 to 1879, and was then the United States Attorney for the Eastern District of Texas in 1879.

Federal judicial service

McCormick was nominated by President Rutherford B. Hayes on April 7, 1879, to the United States District Court for the Northern District of Texas, to a new seat authorized by 20 Stat. 318. He was confirmed by the United States Senate on April 10, 1879, and received his commission the same day. His service terminated on March 22, 1892, due to his elevation to the Fifth Circuit.

McCormick was nominated by President Benjamin Harrison on January 5, 1892, to the United States Court of Appeals for the Fifth Circuit and the United States Circuit Courts for the Fifth Circuit, to a new joint seat authorized by 26 Stat. 826. He was confirmed by the Senate on March 17, 1892, and received his commission the same day. On December 31, 1911, the Circuit Courts were abolished and he thereafter served only on the Court of Appeals. His service terminated on November 2, 1916, due to his death in Waco, Texas.

References

Sources
 

1832 births
1916 deaths
United States Attorneys for the Eastern District of Texas
Judges of the United States District Court for the Northern District of Texas
United States federal judges appointed by Rutherford B. Hayes
19th-century American judges
Judges of the United States Court of Appeals for the Fifth Circuit
United States federal judges appointed by Benjamin Harrison
People from Brazoria County, Texas
Confederate States Army personnel
19th-century American politicians
United States federal judges admitted to the practice of law by reading law